Robert William Quee (2 September 1877 – 25 February 1920) was a New Zealand cricketer who played first-class cricket for Wellington from 1899 to 1904.

William "Billy" Quee was a batsman who played for Midland in the Wellington competition. He was selected to play for Wellington in December 1899 after consistent batting and safe fielding in club cricket. On his first-class debut against Canterbury he scored
31 and 51, top-scoring in Wellington's second innings when he played "very forcibly", but Canterbury won by one wicket.

He was unable to maintain this form, and although he was a regular member of the Wellington team for the next five years, he seldom again reached double-figures. He remained prominent in Wellington club cricket. In 1901-02 he made the highest score in the Wellington senior club season, 174. In one club match he scored 11 runs off one hit: eight run by the batsmen and three overthrows.

Excessive drinking led him into trouble with the law in Wellington in 1915. He later moved to the Ōrongorongo region and then to Hawera, where he worked as a signwriter. He died at his home in Hawera of pneumonia at the age of 42.

References

External links
 
 

1877 births
1920 deaths
Cricketers from Wellington City
New Zealand cricketers
Wellington cricketers
Deaths from pneumonia in New Zealand